Emrich is a surname. Notable people with the surname include:

Alan Emrich, American writer about and designer of computer games
Armin Emrich (born 1951), German handball player
Brian Emrich (born 1961), sound designer, composer, and musician
Clyde Emrich (1931–2021), American weightlifter